Income declaration scheme, 2016 was an amnesty scheme introduced by Narendra Modi led Government of India as a part of the 2016 Union budget to unearth black money and bring it back into the system. Lasting from 1 June to 30 September, the scheme provided an opportunity to income tax and wealth tax defaulters to avoid litigation and become compliant by declaring their assets, paying the tax on them and a penalty of 45% thereafter.

The scheme guaranteed immunity from prosecution under the Income Tax Act, Wealth Tax Act, 1957, and the Benami Transactions (Prohibition) Act, 1988 and also ensured that declarations under it would not be subjected to any scrutinies or inquiries.

Notable declarations

See also 
 Voluntary Disclosure of Income Scheme
 Pradhan Mantri Garib Kalyan Yojana, 2016

References

Income tax in India
2016 in Indian economy
Tax evasion in India
Government schemes in India